Stromatella bermudana is a saxicolous (rock-dwelling) crustose lichen. It is the only species in Stromatella, a monotypic fungal genus in the family Lichinaceae. The genus was circumscribed in 1989 by German lichenologist Aino Henssen. This species was originally described as Psorotichia bermudana by US botanist Lincoln Ware Riddle in 1916, from specimens collected in Bermuda.

References

Lichinomycetes
Lichen species
Lichens described in 1916
Lichens of the Caribbean